Mirambeau is a commune in the Charente-Maritime department in the Nouvelle-Aquitaine region in southwestern France.

Mirambeau is situated on the Via Turonensis, the ancient pilgrimage route from Paris to Santiago de Compostela via Tours.

Population

The inhabitants of the town of Mirambeau are called Mirambeaulais.

Chateau Mirambeau 

First mentioned in the 11th century, the magnificent Chateau Mirambeau is situated on a 40 metre high hill overlooking the town. Today it is used as a 5-star hotel with 22 rooms and a restaurant.

See also
Communes of the Charente-Maritime department

References

External links

 Mirambeau on the Quid site

Communes of Charente-Maritime
Charente-Maritime communes articles needing translation from French Wikipedia
County of Saintonge